Catocala desiderata is a moth of the family Erebidae first described by Staudinger in 1888. It is found in Asia, including Uzbekistan, Tajikistan and Xinjiang in China.

References

Moths described in 1888
desiderata
Moths of Asia